Paramordellana is a genus of beetles in the family Mordellidae, containing the following species:

 Paramordellana carinata (Smith, 1883)
 Paramordellana ruficauda (Maeklin, 1875)
 Paramordellana triloba (Say, 1824)

References

Mordellidae